University Parkway may refer to:

Roads
County Road 610 (Manatee County, Florida), known as University Parkway
University Parkway (Baltimore)
University Parkway (Evansville)
Georgia State Route 316, known as University Parkway
Utah State Route 265, known as University Parkway
University Parkway (Winston-Salem)

Other
University District, San Bernardino, often referred to as University Parkway
Boulevard Line (Brooklyn), now University Parkway